Clyde Donald Kaiser (born February 3, 1935) is an American former professional baseball player and a pitcher in Major League Baseball for the Chicago Cubs between  and . A high school phenom from Byng, Oklahoma, Kaiser was the first "Bonus Baby" signed by the Cub franchise.

At Byng High School, Kaiser won 49 of 50 decisions and pitched seven no-hitters and two perfect games. He attended East Central University on a basketball scholarship, but was signed by the Cubs for a $15,000 bonus after one semester.

He was used sparingly to begin , until June 2, when he received his first starting assignment. Facing the defending world champion Brooklyn Dodgers at Wrigley Field, he allowed only two hits, four bases on balls and one run in a complete game, 8–1 triumph. Almost exactly a month later, on July 1, he shut out the Milwaukee Braves on six hits and only one walk, with five strikeouts. Kaiser made 22 starts for the 1956 Cubs and his career-best 3.59 earned run average was third-best on the team, but his won–lost record was only 4–9, and the Cubs finished eighth and last in the National League at 60–94. He began  in the rotation and in his third start, on May 6, he defeated the New York Giants on six hits, 6–2, at the Polo Grounds, for the sixth and last complete game of his career.

But Kaiser spent the bulk of 1957 in the top-level (Open Classification) Pacific Coast League until he was called up in September. In his one late-season appearance, he turned in a mediocre start against the Cincinnati Redlegs, allowing four earned runs in four innings pitched—just enough to be tagged with Chicago's 4–3 defeat. It was the last appearance of his Cub and major league career. In 58 games pitched, 35 of them starts, Kaiser compiled a 6–15 won–lost mark and a 4.15 career ERA. In 240 innings, he allowed 255 hits and 85 bases on balls, and was credited with 108 strikeouts. His blanking of the Braves in July 1956 was his only career MLB shutout.

Kaiser would be included in off-season trades to the Braves in December 1957 and the Detroit Tigers in October 1959, but he never returned to the major leagues. He retired from pro ball after the 1961 season.

References

External links

1935 births
Living people
Atlanta Crackers players
Baseball players from Oklahoma
Birmingham Barons players
Chicago Cubs players
Denver Bears players
East Central Tigers baseball players
Louisville Colonels (minor league) players
Major League Baseball pitchers
People from Pontotoc County, Oklahoma
Portland Beavers players
Wichita Braves players